The 2000 Oklahoma Democratic presidential primary took place on March 14, 2000 to select the state's 45 pledged delegates to the 2000 Democratic National Convention. Seven other states held their primary concurrently on the day of the Oklahoma primary. 

Al Gore won the primary by a comfortable margin and earned 38 delegates, while Bill Bradley won enough votes to qualify for seven delegates despite having ended his presidential campaign the previous week.

Results

References

Notes 

Oklahoma
Democratic
Oklahoma Democratic primaries